Thomas Habinek (December 25, 1953 – January 19, 2019) was an American classical scholar.

He specialized in Latin literature and Roman cultural history.

Life and career
Habinek received his AB in classics from Princeton University in 1975, and later completed his PhD in classical philology from Harvard University in 1981.

He was a professor of classics at University of Southern California from 1992 – 2019, and received two fellowships from the American Council of Learned Societies and the Associates' Award for Excellence in Teaching. He died on January 19, 2019, at the age of 65.

Bibliography
Some of his  books are:
 Ancient Rhetoric and Oratory
 The World of Roman Song: From Ritualized Speech to Social Order
 The Politics of Latin Literature: Writing, Identity, and Empire in Ancient Rome.
 The Roman Cultural Revolution
 The Colometry of Latin Prose

References

External links
 University of Southern California faculty bio
 University of Southern California Press Room

1953 births
2019 deaths
21st-century American historians
American male non-fiction writers
Princeton University alumni
Harvard Graduate School of Arts and Sciences alumni
University of Southern California faculty
Historians from California
21st-century American male writers